Yau-Woon Ma or Y. W. Ma (born 1940) is emeritus professor of Chinese literature at the University of Hawaii at Manoa. He received his Ph.D. from Yale University in 1971. He has held visiting professorships in Stanford University, National Taiwan University, National Tsing Hua University, Tunghai University, Lingnan University, and the University of Hong Kong (where he received his bachelor's degree in 1965).

Bibliography

 — as associate editor

References

1940 births
Living people
Hong Kong emigrants to the United States
American sinologists
Yale University alumni
Alumni of the University of Hong Kong
Stanford University staff
American expatriates in Taiwan
University of Hawaiʻi faculty